The Truth is the commercial debut studio album from South Auckland, New Zealand Rapper Young Sid, released through Move The Crowd records (a subsidiary of Universal). The album was the product of Young Sid's visit to New York City in 2006 where he recorded with credited producer Cochise. After spending 16 days in the studio Young Sid returned home to New Zealand where he completed The Truth in the MTC studios.

Track listing

Awards and nominations

2007 Nesian Vibes Awards
 2007 Single of the Year ("Hood like me")  - Nominated
 2007 Hip-Hop Album of the Year ("The Truth")  - Nominated

2008 New Zealand Music Awards
 2008 Hip-Hop Album of the Year ("The Truth")  - Nominated

2008 Maori Music Awards
 2008 Maori Urban Album of the Year ("The Truth") - Won

References

http://www.nzmusician.co.nz/index.php/pi_pageid/8/pi_articleid/1229/pi_page/1
http://www.movethecrowd.co.nz/young_sid.shtml
http://www.muzic.net.nz/artists/2323/bio.html
https://www.youtube.com/watch?v=6gIEKPnqn2U
http://www.nzmusician.co.nz/index.php/ps_pagename/article/pi_articleid/1229

2007 debut albums
Young Sid albums